Browns Canyon Wash, also known as Browns Canyon Creek, is a  tributary of the Los Angeles River in the Santa Susana Mountains of Los Angeles County and across the western San Fernando Valley of Los Angeles, California.

Course
The stream begins as a free-flowing stream in Browns Canyon of the eastern Santa Susana Mountains, partially within Michael D. Antonovich Regional Park at Joughlin Ranch. It runs along Browns Canyon Road, which leads to the Cold War Oat Mountain Nike missile base site, on the border of the Chatsworth and Porter Ranch communities.

After passing under the State Route 118 (Ronald Reagan Memorial Freeway), it is then encased in a concrete flood control channel, traveling southwards through Chatsworth, Canoga Park, and Winnetka. Its confluence with the Los Angeles River is just west of Mason Avenue and north of Vanowen Avenue.
The channel walls near Winnetka were damaged in the 1994 Northridge earthquake.

The wash features an equestrian and bicycle path along its eastern bank in Chatsworth.

Crossings and tributaries
From mouth to source (year built in parentheses):

Sherman Way (1971)
Valerio Street [Pedestrian Bridge]
Saticoy Street (1971)
near Arminta Street [Pedestrian Bridge]
Roscoe Boulevard (1971)
De Soto Avenue (1972)
Santa Susana Creek enters
Parthenia Street (1972)
Nordhoff Street (1971)
Railroad: Amtrak Coast Starlight, Pacific Surfliner / Metrolink Ventura County Line
Lassen Street (1971)
Devonshire Street/Canoga Avenue (1974)
Chatsworth Street (1972)
Variel Avenue (1973)
Rinaldi Street (1973)
State Route 118 (Simi Valley Freeway) offramp to De Soto Avenue (1971)
State Route 118 - Ronald Reagan Freeway (1971)
Browns Canyon Road

See also

References

Rivers of Los Angeles County, California
Tributaries of the Los Angeles River
Washes of California
Geography of the San Fernando Valley
Santa Susana Mountains
Canoga Park, Los Angeles
Chatsworth, Los Angeles
Porter Ranch, Los Angeles
Winnetka, Los Angeles
Rivers of Southern California